Monroe City Schools is a school district headquartered in Monroe, Louisiana, United States. 

The district serves the City of Monroe.

William Derwood Cann, Jr., later the interim mayor of Monroe from 1978 to 1979, served on the Monroe school board from 1968 to 1972

Schools

High schools
 Carroll High School  (Bulldogs)
 Neville High School (Tigers)
 Wossman High School  (Wildcats)

Junior high schools
6-8
 Martin Luther King Jr., Middle School
Excellence Academy Charter School
7-8
 Carroll Junior High School
 Neville Junior High School

Elementary schools
PK-6
 Carver Elementary School
 J. S. Clark Magnet Elementary School
 Cypress Point Elementary School
 Barkdull Faulk Elementary School
 Madison James Foster Elementary School
 Sallie Humble Elementary School
 Lexington Elementary School
 Lincoln Elementary School
PK-5
 Berg Jones Elementary School
 Minnie Ruffin Elementary School
3-5
 Jefferson Upper Elementary School
PK-2
 Clara Hall Elementary School
 Lexington Elementary School
MCS District

References

External links
 Monroe City Schools

School districts in Louisiana
Education in Ouachita Parish, Louisiana